This article is a list of settlements in Erzurum province, Turkey by district. There are 21 districts, 14 belde and 967 villages in this province.

Aşkale 
Belde
 Kandilli
Villages

 Abdalcık
 Akören
 Altıntaş
 Bağırsak
 Ballıtaş
 Bozburun
 Büyükgeçit
 Çatalbayır
 Çatören
 Çatören
 Çayköy
 Çiftlik
 Dağyurdu
 Dallı
 Demirkıran
 Dereköy
 Düzyurt
 Eyüpoğlu
 Gökçebük
 Gölören
 Gölören
 Güllüdere
 Gümüşseren
 Güneyçam
 Gürkaynak
 Hacıbekir
 Hacıhamza
 Hacımahmut
 Hatuncuk
 Haydarhacı
 Kapıkale
 Karahasan
 Karasu
 Kavurmaçukuru
 Koçbaba
 Koşapınar
 Kurtmahmut
 Küçükgeçit
 Küçükova
 Kükürtlü
 Merdivenköy
 Mezraa
 Musadanışman
 Ocaklı
 Ovacık
 Özler
 Pırnakapan
 Saptıran
 Sarıbaba
 Sazlı
 Taşağıl
 Taşlıçayır
 Tecer
 Tepsicik
 Tokça
 Topalçavuş
 Tosunlu
 Tozluca
 Turaç
 Yaylaköy
 Yaylayolu
 Yaylımlı
 Yumruveren

Aziziye 
Villages

 Ağcakent
 Ahırcık
 Akdağ
 Akyazı
 Alaca
 Alaybeyi
 Aşağıcanören
 Atlıkonak
 Aynalıkale
 Başçakmak
 Başkent
 Başkurtdere
 Başovacık
 Bingöze
 Çamlıca
 Çatak
 Çavdarlı
 Çavuşoğlu
 Çıkrıklı
 Çiğdemli
 Dağdagül
 Eğerti
 Elmalı
 Emrecik
 Eskipolat
 Eşkinkaya
 Gelinkaya
 Geyik
 Güllüce
 Halilkaya
 Kabaktepe
 Kapılı
 Karakale
 Kavaklıdere
 Kızılkale
 Kumluyazı
 Kuzgun
 Kuzuluk
 Ocak
 Paşayurdu
 Rizekent
 Sarıyazla
 Sırlı
 Sorkunlu
 Söğütlü
 Taşpınar
 Tebrizcik
 Toprakkale
 Üçköşe
 Yeşilova
 Yeşilvadi
 Yoncalık
 Yukarıcanören

Çat 
Belde
 Yavi
Villages

 Aşağıçatköy
 Babaderesi
 Bağlıca
 Bardakçı
 Başköy
 Bayındır
 Bozyazı
 Budaklar
 Çayırtepe
 Çimenözü
 Çirişli
 Çukurçayır
 Değirmenli
 Elmapınar
 Göbekören
 Gökçeşeyh
 Gölköy
 Hatunköy
 Işkınlı
 Kaplıca
 Karabey
 Karaca
 Karaşeyh
 Köseler
 Kumaşlı
 Kurbanlı
 Mollaömer
 Muratçayırı
 Parmaksız
 Saltaş
 Sarıkaşık
 Sarıkaya
 Soğukpınar
 Söbeçayır
 Şeyhhasan
 Taşağıl
 Tuzlataşı
 Tüysüz
 Yarmak
 Yaylasuyu
 Yukarıçat

Hınıs 
Belde
 Halilçavuş
Villages

 Acarköy
 Akbayır
 Akçamelik
 Akgelin
 Akgöze
 Akören
 Alaca
 Alagöz
 Alınteri
 Alikırı
 Altınpınar
 Arpadere
 Avcılar
 Başköy
 Bayırköy
 Bellitaş
 Beyyurdu
 Burhanköy
 Çakmak
 Çamurlu
 Çatak
 Çilligöl
 Dağçayırı
 Demirci
 Derince
 Dervişali
 Dibekli
 Dikili
 Divanhüseyin
 Elbeyli
 Elmadalı
 Erduran
 Erence
 Esenli
 Göller
 Güllüçimen
 Gürçayır
 Güzeldere
 Hayran
 Ilıcaköy
 İsmail
 Kalecik
 Karaağaç
 Karabudak
 Karamolla
 Kazancı
 Ketenci
 Kızılahmet
 Kızmusa
 Kongur
 Meydanköy
 Mezraa
 Mollacelil
 Mollakulaç
 Mutluca
 Ortaköy
 Ovaçevirme
 Ovakozlu
 Parmaksız
 Pınarköy
 Saltepe
 Sıldız
 Söğütlü
 Sultanlı
 Suvaran
 Şahabettinköy
 Şahverdi
 Şalgamköy
 Tanır
 Tapuköy
 Taşbulak
 Tellitepe
 Tipideresi
 Toprakkale
 Toraman
 Uluçayır
 Uyanık
 Ünlüce
 Yamanlar
 Yaylakonak
 Yelpiz
 Yeniköy
 Yeşilyazı
 Yolüstü

Horasan 
Villages

 Ağıllı
 Akçataş
 Akçatoprak
 Alagöz
 Aliçeyrek
 Aras
 Ardı
 Arpaçayır
 Aşağıaktaş
 Aşağıbademözü
 Azapköy
 Bahçeköy
 Bulgurlu
 Çamlıkale
 Çamurlu
 Çayırdüzü
 Çiftlikköy
 Dalbaşı
 Danişment
 Değirmenler
 Dikili
 Döllek
 Dönertaş
 Eğertaşlar
 Gerek
 Gündeğer
 Güzelyayla
 Hacıahmet
 Hacıhalil
 Harçlı
 Hasanbey
 Haydarlı
 Hızardere
 Hızırilyas
 İğdeli
 İncesu
 Kadıcelal
 Kalender
 Karabıyık
 Karacaören
 Karaçuha
 Karapınar
 Kaynarca
 Kemerli
 Kepenek
 Kırık
 Kırkdikme
 Kırkgözeler
 Kırklar
 Kızılca
 Kızlarkale
 Küçükkonak
 Kükürtlü
 Mollaahmet
 Mollamelik
 Muratbağı
 Pınarköy
 Pirali
 Pirhasan
 Saçlık
 Sekman
 Şeyhyusuf
 Tahirhoca
 Tavşancık
 Teknecik
 Yarboğaz
 Yaylacık
 Yazılıtaş
 Yeşildere
 Yeşilöz
 Yeşilyurt
 Yıldıran
 Yukarıbademözü
 Yukarıhorum
 Yukarıtahirhoca
 Yürükatlı
 Yüzören

İspir 
Belde
 Çamlıkaya
 Madenköprübaşı
Villages

 Ahlatlı
 Akgüney
 Akpınar
 Akseki
 Aksu
 Aktaş
 Alacabük
 Araköy
 Ardışlı
 Armutlu
 Aşağıfındıklı
 Atürküten
 Avcıköy
 Bademli
 Bahçeli
 Başçeşme
 Başköy
 Başpınar
 Bostancı
 Bozan
 Cankurtaran
 Cibali
 Çakmaklı
 Çatakkaya
 Çayırbaşı
 Çayırözü
 Değirmendere
 Değirmenli
 Demirbilek
 Demirkaya
 Devedağı
 Duruköy
 Düzköy
 Geçitağzı
 Göçköy
 Gölyurt
 Gündoğdu
 Güney
 Halilpaşa
 Irmakköy
 İncesu
 İyidere
 Karahan
 Karakale
 Karakamış
 Karakaya
 Karaseydi
 Kavaklı
 Kaynakbaşı
 Kırık
 Kızılhasan
 Kirazlı
 Koçköy
 Köprüköy
 Kümetaş
 Leylekköy
 Mescitli
 Moryayla
 Mülkköy
 Numanpaşa
 Ortaköy
 Ortaören
 Özlüce
 Öztoprak
 Petekli
 Pınarlı
 Sandıklı
 Sırakonak
 Soğuksu
 Şenköy
 Taşbaşı
 Taşlıca
 Tekpınar
 Tepecik
 Ulubel
 Ulutaş
 Üzümbağı
 Yağlı
 Yaylacık
 Yedigöl
 Yedigöze
 Yeşiltepe
 Yeşilyurt
 Yıldıztepe
 Yukarıfındıklı
 Yunusköy
 Zeyrek

Karaçoban 
Belde
 Kopal
Villages

 Akkavak
 Binpınar
 Bozyer
 Budaklı
 Burnaz
 Çatalgül
 Dedeören
 Doğanbey
 Duman
 Erenler
 Gündüzköy
 Karagöz
 Karaköprü
 Karmış
 Kırımkaya
 Kuşluca
 Marufköy
 Molladavut
 Ovayoncalı

Karayazı 
Villages
 Abdurrahmanköy
 Ağaçlı
 Akarsu
 Akpınar
 Alemdağı
 Aliküllek
 Anıtlı
 Aşağıincesu
 Aşağısöylemez
 Aydınsu
 Bezirhane
 Çakmaközü
 Çalışkan
 Çaltılı
 Çatalören
 Çavuşköy
 Çayırbeyli
 Çelikli
 Çepi
 Değirmenkaya
 Doruca
 Dörtpınar
 Duruca
 Dündarköy
 Geventepe
 Göksu
 Göktepe
 Güllü
 Hacıbayram
 Hasanova
 Kapanlı
 Karaağıl
 Karabey
 Karakale
 Karakaya
 Karasu
 Kayalar
 Kazbel
 Kırgındere
 Kırıkpınar
 Kösehasan
 Köyceğiz
 Kurupınar
 Mollabekir
 Mollaosman
 Muratlı
 Payveren
 Salyamaç
 Sancaktar
 Sarıçiçek
 Selenli
 Sukonak
 Sulutaş
 Şakirköy
 Taşan
 Tosunlu
 Turnagöl
 Uğurdalı
 Ulucanlar
 Üzengili
 Yahyaköy
 Yalındal
 Yeniköy
 Yeşilova
 Yeşilyurt
 Yiğityolu
 Yolgören
 Yukarıcihanbey
 Yukarıçığılgan
 Yukarısöylemez
 Yücelik

Köprüköy 
Belde
 Yağan
Villages

 Ağcaşar
 Akçam
 Alaca
 Aşağıçakmak
 Aşağıkızılkale
 Ataköy
 Buğdaylı
 Çullu
 Derebaşı
 Dilek
 Duatepe
 Dumankaya
 Eğirmez
 Emre
 Eyüpler
 Geyikli
 Gölçayır
 Güzelhisar
 Ilıcasu
 Karataşlar
 Kayabaşı
 Kıyıkonak
 Marifet
 Mescitli
 Ortaklar
 Örentaş
 Pekecik
 Sarıtaş
 Savatlı
 Soğuksu
 Topçu
 Yapağılı
 Yemlik
 Yeşilöz
 Yılanlı
 Yukarıkızılca
 Yukarıkızılkale
 Yukarısöğütlü

Narman 
 Narman
Belde
 Şekerli
Villages

 Alabalık
 Alacayar
 Araköy
 Aşağıyayla
 Başkale
 Beyler
 Boğakale
 Çamlıyayla
 Çimenli
 Dağyolu
 Demirdağ
 Ergazi
 Gökdağ
 Göllü
 Güllüdağ
 Güvenlik
 Kamışözü
 Karadağ
 Karapınar
 Kışlaköy
 Kilimli
 Koçkaya
 Koyunören
 Kuruçalı
 Mahmutçavuş
 Mercimekli
 Pınaryolu
 Samikale
 Sapanlı
 Savaşçılar
 Serinsu
 Sülüklü
 Sütpınar
 Şehitler
 Taşburun
 Telli
 Toygarlı
 Tuztaşı
 Yanıktaş
 Yoldere
 Yukarıyayla

Oltu 
 Oltu
Villages

 Alatarla
 Arıtaş
 Aşağı Çamlı
 Aşağı Kumlu
 Ayvalı
 Ayyıldız
 Bahçecik
 Bahçelikışla
 Ballıca
 Başaklı
 Başbağlar
 Çamlıbel
 Çanakpınar
 Çatak
 Çatalsöğüt
 Çayüstü
 Çengelli
 Dağdibi
 Damarlıtaş
 Demirtaş
 Derebaşı
 Dokuzdeğirmen
 Duralar
 Dutlu
 Elmadüzü
 Erdoğmuş
 Esenyamaç
 Gökçedere
 Günlüce
 Güryaprak
 Güzelsu
 İğdeli
 İnanmış
 İnciköy
 İpekçayırı
 İriağaç
 Kaleboğazı
 Karataş
 Kayaaltı
 Kemerkaya
 Konukseven
 Küçükorucuk
 Nüğürcük
 Obayayla
 Orucuk
 Özdere
 Sağlıcak
 Sarısaz
 Subatuk
 Süleymanlı
 Sülünkaya
 Şendurak
 Tekeli
 Toklu
 Topkaynak
 Toprakkale
 Tutlu
 Tutmaç
 Tuzlaköy
 Ünlükaya
 Vişneli
 Yarbaşı
 Yaylaçayır
 Yolboyu
 Yukarıçamlı
 Yukarıkumlu

Olur 
 Olur
Villages

 Akbayır
 Altunkaya
 Aşağıçayırlı
 Aşağıkaracasu
 Atlı
 Begendik
 Beşkaya
 Boğazgören
 Bozdoğan
 Coşkunlar
 Çataksu
 Eğlek
 Ekinlik
 Filizli
 Güngöründü
 Ilıkaynak
 Kaban
 Kaledibi
 Karakoçlar
 Keçili
 Kekikli
 Köprübaşı
 Oğuzkent
 Olgun
 Olurdere
 Ormanağzı
 Sarıbaşak
 Soğukgöze
 Süngübayırı
 Şalpazarı
 Taşgeçit
 Taşlıköy
 Uzunharman
 Ürünlü
 Yaylabaşı
 Yeşilbağlar
 Yıldızkaya
 Yolgözler
 Yukarıçayırlı
 Yukarıkaracasu

Palandöken 
 Palandöken
Villages

 Dereboğazı
 Güzelyurt
 Yukarıyenice

Pasinler 
 Pasinler
Belde
 Alvar
Villages

 Acı
 Ağcalar
 Altınbaşak
 Ardıçlı
 Aşıtlar
 Baldızı
 Başören
 Bulkasım
 Büyükdere
 Çakırtaş
 Çalıyazı
 Çamlıca
 Çiçekli
 Çöğender
 Demirdöven
 Epsemce
 Esendere
 Gölciğez
 Hanahmet
 Karakale
 Karavelet
 Kavuşturan
 Kevenlik
 Kızılören
 Korucuk
 Kotandüzü
 Kurbançayırı
 Otlukkapı
 Ovaköy
 Övenler
 Pelitli
 Porsuk
 Saksı
 Serçeboğazı
 Sunak
 Taşağıl
 Taşkaynak
 Taşlıgüney
 Taşlıyurt
 Tepecik
 Timar
 Uzunark
 Üğümü
 Yastıktepe
 Yavuzlu
 Yayla
 Yayladağ
 Yeniköy
 Yiğitpınarı
 Yiğittaşı
 Yukarıçakmak
 Yukarıdanişment

Pazaryolu 
 Pazaryolu
Villages

 Ambaralan
 Ayçukuru
 Bayındır
 Büyükdere
 Cenetpınarı
 Cevizlidere
 Çatakbahçe
 Çaydere
 Çiftepınar
 Demirgöze
 Dikmetaş
 Esenyurt
 Gölyanı
 Göztepe
 Gülçimen
 Güneysu
 Hacılar
 Karakoç
 Karataş
 Kılıççı
 Konakyeri
 Korkutköy
 Kozlu
 Köşeyolu
 Kumaşkaya
 Kuymaklı
 Laleli
 Meşebaşı
 Pamukludağ
 Sadaka
 Sergenkaya
 Şehitlik
 Yaylalı
 Yaylaözü
 Yiğitbaşı

Şenkaya 
 Şenkaya
Belde
 Paşalı
Villages

 Akşar
 Aktaş
 Alıcık
 Aşağıbakraçlı
 Atyolu
 Aydoğdu
 Balkaya
 Bereketli
 Beşpınarlar
 Beykaynak
 Çamlıalan
 Çatalelma
 Değirmenlidere
 Deliktaş
 Doğanköy
 Dokuzelma
 Dolunay
 Dörtyol
 Esence
 Esenyurt
 Evbakan
 Gaziler
 Gezenek
 Göllet
 Göreşken
 Gözalan
 Gözebaşı
 Gülveren
 Hoşköy
 İçmesu
 İğdeli
 İkizpınar
 İnceçay
 Kayalısu
 Kaynak
 Kireçli
 Köroğlu
 Köşkköy
 Kürkçü
 Nişantaşı
 Ormanlı
 Oyuktaş
 Özyurt
 Penek
 Sarıkayalar
 Sarıyar
 Sındıran
 Söğütler
 Susuz
 Şenpınar
 Tahtköy
 Tazeköy
 Teketaş
 Timurkışla
 Turnalı
 Tütenocak
 Uğurlu
 Yanıkkaval
 Yaymeşe
 Yazılı
 Yelkıran
 Yeşildemet
 Yeşilkaya
 Yoğurtçular
 Yukarıbakraçlı
 Yünören
 Yürekli
 Zümrütköy

Tekman 
 Tekman
Villages

 Ağcakoca
 Akdağ
 Akdamar
 Akpınar
 Alabayır
 Aşağıhanbeyi
 Aşağıtepecik
 Aydınlı
 Beşdere
 Beyköy
 Çağlar
 Çatak
 Çatkale
 Çayırdağı
 Çevirme
 Çiçekdağı
 Çukuryayla
 Dalsöğüt
 Deliler
 Dengiz
 Düzyurt
 Erence
 Geçitköy
 Gökoğlan
 Gözlüce
 Gülveren
 Gümüşlük
 Gündamı
 Güneşli
 Gürgür
 Güzeldere
 Hacıömer
 Hamzalar
 Hüseyinağa
 Ilıgöze
 Işıklar
 İncesu
 Kalaycı
 Karapınar
 Karataş
 Karatepe
 Karlıca
 Katranlı
 Kayaboğaz
 Kazancık
 Kırıkhan
 Koçyayla
 Körsu
 Kuruca
 Küllü
 Mescitli
 Mollamehmet
 Susuz
 Şakşak
 Taşkesen
 Toptepe
 Turnagöl
 Yalınca
 Yerköy
 Yeşilören
 Yiğitler
 Yoncalı
 Yukarıhanbeyi
 Yukarıtepecik
 Yuvaklı
 Yücepınar

Tortum 
 Tortum
Belde
 Bağbaşı
 Pehlivanlı
 Serdarlı
 Şenyurt

Villages

 Akbaba
 Aksu
 Aktaş
 Alapınar
 Arılı
 Aşağıkatıklı
 Ballı
 Çakıllı
 Çardaklı
 Çataldere
 Çaylıca
 Çiftlikköy
 Çivilikaya
 Demirciler
 Derinpınar
 Dikmen
 Doruklu
 Esendurak
 Gökdere
 Hamidiye
 İncedere
 Kapıkaya
 Karlı
 Kazandere
 Kemerkaya
 Kırmalı
 Kireçli
 Meydanlar
 Peynirli
 Suyatağı
 Taşbaşı
 Taşoluk
 Tatlısu
 Tipili
 Tortumkale
 Uzunkavak
 Vişneli
 Yağcılar
 Yamankaya
 Yazyurdu
 Yellitepe
 Yukarı Sivri
 Yumaklı
 Ziyaret

Uzundere 
 Uzundere
Villages

 Altınçanak
 Balıklı
 Cevizli
 Çağlayan
 Çamlıyamaç
 Dikyar
 Gölbaşı
 Kirazlı
 Sapaca
 Ulubağ

Yakutiye 
 Yakutiye
Villages

 Akdağ
 Gökçeyamaç
 Güngörmez
 Güzelyayla
 Karagöbek
 Kırkgöze
 Köşkköy
 Söğütyanı
 Şenyurt
 Yeşildere

References 

Populated places in Erzurum Province
Erzurum